Stuart Levy may refer to:

 Stuart Levy (producer) (1907–1966), British film producer
 Stuart B. Levy, microbiology researcher and physician at Tufts University
 Stuart J. Levy (born 1967), founder of the manga media company Tokyopop

See also
Stuart A. Levey, former Under Secretary for Terrorism and Financial Intelligence for the United States Department of the Treasury